Kentucky Route 528 (KY 528) is a  state highway in Washington County, Kentucky, that runs from Kentucky Routes 55 and 3164 southwest of Springfield to Kentucky Route 438 at the Lincoln Homestead State Park via Springfield.

Major intersections

References

0528
Transportation in Washington County, Kentucky
Springfield, Kentucky